Beautiful frog may refer to one of the following frog species:

 Beautiful mantella (Mantella pulchra), found in subtropical or tropical moist lowland forests, subtropical or tropical swamps, and swamps
 Beautiful nursery-frog (Cophixalus concinnus), found in Australia's montane rain forests
 Beautiful pygmy frog (Microhyla pulchra), a frog of the family Microhylidae found in Asia